Patrick Avalon Corbett (born 12 February 1963) is an English former professional footballer who played for Tottenham Hotspur, Orient and represented England at youth level.

Playing career
Corbett joined Tottenham Hotspur as an apprentice and signed professional forms in October, 1980. The central defender made his senior debut against Southampton at The Dell on 31 October 1981–a match in which he scored the winning goal. Corbett featured in five matches and scored the one goal between 1981–1983 for the Spurs. He transferred to Orient in August, 1983 where he went on to make 77 appearances and netting two goals.

In 1986 Corbett moved to Finland where he played five seasons for Kuopion Elo and one season with MYPA.

References

1963 births
Living people
Footballers from the London Borough of Hackney
English footballers
English Football League players
Tottenham Hotspur F.C. players
Leyton Orient F.C. players
Myllykosken Pallo −47 players
Association football central defenders